Nils Haagensen (born 20 May 1955) is a Danish equestrian. He competed at five Olympic Games.

References

External links
 

1955 births
Living people
Danish male equestrians
Danish dressage riders
Olympic equestrians of Denmark
Equestrians at the 1976 Summer Olympics
Equestrians at the 1988 Summer Olympics
Equestrians at the 1992 Summer Olympics
Equestrians at the 1996 Summer Olympics
Equestrians at the 2000 Summer Olympics
People from Næstved Municipality
Sportspeople from Region Zealand